The Undoing is a 2020 American mystery psychological thriller television miniseries based on the 2014 novel You Should Have Known by Jean Hanff Korelitz. It was written and produced by David E. Kelley and directed by Susanne Bier. The miniseries stars Nicole Kidman and Hugh Grant and premiered on HBO on October 25, 2020.

The Undoing was the first HBO show to gain viewership every week over the course of the season, and was the biggest U.S. show to launch on Sky in the U.K, beating the record previously held by Game of Thrones. It was the most-watched show on HBO in 2020. The series received generally positive reviews, with critics praising the performances (particularly Kidman and Grant), cinematography and production design, but some criticizing the writing, pace and characterization.

Cast and characters

 Nicole Kidman as Grace Fraser
 Hugh Grant as Jonathan Fraser
 Édgar Ramírez as Detective Joe Mendoza
 Noah Jupe as Henry Fraser
 Lily Rabe as Sylvia Steinetz
 Matilda De Angelis as Elena Alves
 Ismael Cruz Córdova as Fernando Alves
 Edan Alexander as Miguel Alves
 Annaleigh Ashford as Alexis Young
 Fala Chen as Jolene McCall
 Tarik Davis as Michael Hoffman
 Michael Devine as Detective Paul O'Rourke
 Maria Dizzia as Diane Porter
 Rosemary Harris as Janet Fraser
 Vedette Lim as Amanda Emory
 Janel Moloney as Sally Maybury
 Matt McGrath as Joseph Hoffman
 Jeremy Shamos as Robert Connaver
 Tracee Chimo Pallero as Rebecca Harkness
 Jason Kravits as Dr. Stuart Rosenfeld
 Donald Sutherland as Franklin Reinhardt
 Noma Dumezweni as Haley Fitzgerald
 Sofie Gråbøl as Catherine Stamper
 Douglas Hodge as Robert Adelman
 Adriane Lenox as Judge Layla Scott
Connie Chung as Herself

Episodes

Production

Development
On March 12, 2018, it was announced that HBO had given the production a series order. The miniseries was written by David E. Kelley who also serves as executive producer alongside Nicole Kidman, Per Saari, and Bruna Papandrea. Production companies involved in the series include Blossom Films, Made Up Stories, and David E. Kelley Productions. On November 7, 2018, it was reported that Susanne Bier would direct every episode of the series and serve as an executive producer. On March 8, 2020, it was announced that the series was set to premiere on May 10, 2020. However, it was later delayed to October 25, 2020, due to the COVID-19 pandemic.

Casting
Alongside the initial series announcement, it was confirmed that, in addition to executive producing the series, Nicole Kidman had been cast in the series' lead female role. In November 2018, it was announced that Hugh Grant and Donald Sutherland had been cast in starring roles. On January 28, 2019, it was reported that Noah Jupe had joined the main cast. In March, Fala Chen, Édgar Ramírez, Lily Rabe, Ismael Cruz Córdova and Matilda De Angelis were added to the cast. In April 2019, it was announced that Noma Dumezweni had joined the cast. Also in April 2019, it was announced that Michael Devine had joined the cast.

Filming
The show filmed in New York City and Kingston, New York. Planned filming on Shelter Island, New York, was canceled due to objections from residents, and therefore the beach and beach house scenes were instead filmed on the North Fork of Long Island.

Reception

Critical response
On Rotten Tomatoes, the miniseries holds an approval rating of 75% based on 90 reviews, with an average rating of 7.20/10. The website's critics consensus reads, "The Undoing is a beautifully shot mystery that benefits greatly from Nicole Kidman and Hugh Grant's performances—if only its story was as strong as its star power." On Metacritic, it has a weighted average score of 64 out of 100 based on 32 reviews, indicating "generally favorable reviews".

Kristen Baldwin of Entertainment Weekly gave the series a 'B' grade and wrote, "Through all of the misdirects, the characters' dumb decisions, the dreamy detours, The Undoing kept me guessing—and, of course, gloating over everyone's misfortune." Reviewing the miniseries for Rolling Stone, Alan Sepinwall gave it 2 out of 5 stars and said, "It's all extremely rote, like an expanded version of the mid-budget Nineties movie that would have starred Kidman and Grant at their respective heights of celebrity."

Assessing the series as a whole following the finale, Roxana Hadadi of Vulture unfavorably compared The Undoing to David E. Kelley's previous series, Big Little Lies (also starring Kidman), stating, "Kelley re-created the elitism of Big Little Lies when adapting You Should Have Known into The Undoing, but neither its introspective spirit nor its curiosity about the inner lives of women." Hadadi particularly criticized the series for its inconsistent and shallow characterization of its protagonist, Grace Fraser, compared to Kidman's Big Little Lies character, Celeste Wright: "In prioritizing unbelievable twists rather than steady character development, Kelley re-creates Grace as a shell of Celeste, making her the hollow center of The Undoing. Grace wears the same kind of clothes as Celeste, and has access to the same powerful allies as Celeste, and lives in the same sort of mansions as Celeste. But Kidman’s performance here is mostly one of wide, shocked eyes and blank, inexpressive despair; her Grace rarely, if ever, talks about herself, her emotions, or her decisions." Eve Gerber of The Atlantic criticized the series for glamorizing domestic violence, noting that critical discussion about the series largely avoided the subject and instead focused more on the series' production values, makeup and costuming.

Ratings

Audience viewership
The series gained traction as the season continued and broke records. For HBO, the show made history as the network's first original series to gain viewership every week over the course of the season and the finale was the most-watched night on the network since the Season 2 finale of Big Little Lies. It became HBO's most-watched show of 2020, surpassing the audience of Big Little Lies.  It also became the biggest U.S. show to launch on Sky in the U.K, beating the record previously held by Game of Thrones.

Awards and nominations

Notes

References

External links
 
 

2020 American television series debuts
2020 American television series endings
2020s American drama television miniseries
2020s American mystery television series
Adultery in television
Narcissism in television
American thriller television series
English-language television shows
HBO original programming
Murder in television
Psychological thriller television series
Television productions postponed due to the COVID-19 pandemic
Television series created by David E. Kelley
Television shows based on American novels
Television shows filmed in New York City
Television shows set in New York City
Television series by Made Up Stories